Claudio Daniel González (born September 12, 1976 in Posadas, Argentina) is a former Argentine footballer currently playing for clubs in Argentina and Chile. He played as an attacker.

Teams
  Patronato de Paraná 1996-1999
  Huracán de Tres Arroyos 1999-2000
  Patronato de Paraná 2000-2001
  Independiente 2001-2002
  Talleres de Córdoba 2002-2003
  Rosario Central 2004
  Cobreloa 2005
  Talleres de Córdoba 2006
  General Paz Juniors 2007

External links
 
 Profile at En una Baldosa 
 

1976 births
Living people
Argentine footballers
Argentine expatriate footballers
Club Atlético Independiente footballers
Club Atlético Patronato footballers
General Paz Juniors footballers
Rosario Central footballers
Talleres de Córdoba footballers
Cobreloa footballers
Chilean Primera División players
Argentine Primera División players
Expatriate footballers in Chile
Association footballers not categorized by position
People from Posadas, Misiones
Sportspeople from Misiones Province